Otitoma astrolabensis is a species of sea snail, a marine gastropod mollusc in the family Pseudomelatomidae, the turrids and allies.

Description

Distribution
This marine species occurs off the Fiji Islands, the Philippines and Indonesia.

References

 Wiedrick S.G. (2014). Review of the genera Otitoma Jousseaume, 1880 and Thelecytharella with the description of two new species Gastropoda: Conoidea: Pseudomelatomidae) from the southwest Pacific Ocean. The Festivus. 46(3): 40-53

External links
 Gastropods.com: Otitoma astrolabensis

astrolabensis
Gastropods described in 2014